François Beyrouti (born July 3, 1971) is an Lebanese-born bishop of the Melkite Greek Catholic Church and serves as eparch for the Eparchy of Newton.

Biography

Early life
Beyrouti was born on 3 July 1971, one of three children born to Elias and Maggy Beyrouti in Hadath-Beirut, Lebanon. After emigrating with his family in 1976 to North Vancouver, British Columbia, Canada, he attended the Saint Thomas Aquinas Catholic High School.

Priesthood
From 1989 to 1993 he studied in the Christ the King seminary in Mission, B.C. He was awarded a degree and doctorate in biblical theology from Saint Paul University, Ottawa, Ontario.  On October 4, 1998, Beyrouti was ordained to the priesthood for the eparchy of Saint-Sauveur de Montréal of the Greek-Melkites. From his ordination to January 31, 2010, Fr. Beyrouti served as pastor of Sts. Peter and Paul Melkite Catholic Church in Ottawa. He was incardinated into the Melkite Greek Catholic Eparchy of Newton and served as pastor at Holy Cross Melkite Catholic Church until his election and consecration as bishop.

Episcopal Career
Pope Francis appointed Beyrouti eparchial bishop for the Eparchy of Newton on August 20, 2022.  On October 12, 2022, Beyrouti was consecrated bishop and on October 19, 2022 was installed as the eparchial bishop.

See also
 

 Catholic Church hierarchy
 Catholic Church in the United States
 Historical list of the Catholic bishops of the United States
 List of Catholic bishops of the United States
 Lists of patriarchs, archbishops, and bishops

References

External links
Eparchy of Newton Official Site

Episcopal succession

1971 births
Living people
People from Baabda District
Lebanese emigrants to Canada
Bishops appointed by Pope Francis